Eri Hosoda (細田絵理 Hosoda Eri, born May 15, 1984) is a Japanese volleyball player who plays for Denso Airybees.

Clubs
OkazakiGakuen High School → Denso Airybees (2003-)

Honors
Team
Japan Volleyball League/V.League/V.Premier　Runners-up (1): 2007-2008
Kurowashiki All Japan Volleyball Championship　Champions (1): 2008

References

External links
Denso Official Website Profile

Japanese women's volleyball players
Living people
1984 births